The April 2010 Sumatra earthquake occurred on  with a moment magnitude of 7.8 and a maximum Mercalli intensity of VIII (Severe). The shock occurred near the Banyak Islands, off the island of Sumatra in Indonesia. A tsunami watch was issued according to the Pacific Tsunami Warning Center in Honolulu which was later canceled.  A 40 cm surge was reported in the Banyak Islands an hour after the quake, along with 62 injuries. Power outages were reported throughout the province of North Sumatra as well as in Aceh. This quake is one in a sequence of large earthquakes along the Sunda megathrust in the 2000s.

In Simeulue Regency, 21 were hospitalized at Gunung Putih, Teluk Dalam subdistrict, and 41 were injured in Teupah Selatan subdistrict. Some of the injured were treated at Simeulue general hospital in Sinabang.

See also
2010 Mentawai earthquake and tsunami
List of earthquakes in 2010
List of earthquakes in Indonesia
March 2007 Sumatra earthquakes
September 2007 Sumatra earthquakes

References

External links
M7.8 - northern Sumatra, Indonesia – United States Geological Survey
Magnitude-7.7 quake rattles Indonesia – MSNBC
M7.8 Banyak Islands Earthquake, 2010 – Amateur Seismic Centre
The Diverse Slip Behavior of the Banyak Islands Section of the Sunda Megathrust Offshore Sumatra – American Geophysical Union

Sumatra
Earthquakes in Indonesia
2010 disasters in Indonesia
Earthquakes in Sumatra
2010 tsunamis
April 2010 events in Indonesia
History of Sumatra